Dmitri Nikolayevich Ulyanov (born 28 October 1970) is a Russian professional football coach and a former player. He is the general director of FC Khimki.

Club career
He made his professional debut in the Soviet Top League in 1991 for FC Torpedo Moscow.

Honours
 Soviet Top League bronze: 1991.
 Israeli Premier League champion: 1999
 Israeli Premier League 3rd place: 1998, 2001.
 Soviet Cup finalist: 1991.
 Russian Cup winner: 1993.

European club competitions
 UEFA Cup 1991–92 with FC Torpedo Moscow: 4 games.
 UEFA Cup 1992–93 with FC Torpedo Moscow: 4 games.
 UEFA Cup Winners' Cup 1993–94 with FC Torpedo Moscow: 2 games.
 UEFA Cup 1996–97 with PFC CSKA Moscow: 1 game.
 UEFA Champions League 1999–2000 qualification with Hapoel Haifa F.C.: 2 games.

References

1970 births
Footballers from Moscow
Living people
Soviet footballers
Russian footballers
FC Torpedo Moscow players
PFC CSKA Moscow players
Racing de Santander players
Hapoel Haifa F.C. players
Beitar Jerusalem F.C. players
Soviet Top League players
Russian Premier League players
La Liga players
Israeli Premier League players
Maccabi Ahi Nazareth F.C. players
Russian expatriate footballers
Expatriate footballers in Spain
Expatriate footballers in Israel
Russian expatriate sportspeople in Spain
Russian expatriate sportspeople in Israel
Association football midfielders
Russian football managers